Southpaw Technology is a commercial, open-source software company that provides products,, professional services and technical support for TACTIC. Founded in 2005 by Gary Mundell and Remko Noteboom, Southpaw Technology originally developed TACTIC to facilitate project management, workflow and digital asset management for production pipelines in feature films, television series and game projects. As TACTIC's technology developed and expanded, Southpaw shifted into providing solutions for enterprise content management. Southpaw's client base now includes enterprise customers from many diverse industries, including media and entertainment, broadcasting, health care and defence. TACTIC has also started to gain attention as a Business Intelligence solution.

Technology
Southpaw Technology develops and supports TACTIC, a web framework that is used to build enterprise solutions of many types. Southpaw solutions and products are all built on TACTIC and they always share a workflow engine combined with production asset management and data management solution that manages work across collaborative teams. The output of the workflow can be anything from the creation of digital assets for visual effects, feature films, video games, advertising, engineering to consumer packaged goods, sportswear, on boarding documents, a regulatory audit trail and many other enterprise uses.

TACTIC is available to download as open-source software under the Eclipse Public License for Mac OS X, Microsoft Windows and Linux. It is also available through a fully supported commercial license. As of summer 2013, TACTIC can be accessed as a hosted cloud service through Amazon Web Services Marketplace.TACTIC combines asset management, file system management, project management, workflow management, data management and web applications. Southpaw announced TACTIC 3.0 at SIGGRAPH 2010 in Los Angeles. Two years later Southpaw made the move to open-source, making TACTIC available to download for free under an Open Source Initiative and the Eclipse Public License. In May 2013, Southpaw released TACTIC version 4.0. In 2014, Southpaw released TACTIC version 4.3.

Clients
As of April 2019, Southpaw's diverse client base includes Procter and Gamble, Turbine, Inc., Viacom, Nissan, Astral Media, Philips, Ubisoft, Blohm + Voss, Lockheed Martin, Legend3D, Adidas, Technicolor, Tegna, Transunion and Teague.

See also
 Comparison of project management software

References

Technology companies of Canada
Companies based in Toronto